"Every Generation Got Its Own Disease" (also simply known as "Every Generation") is a song by German rock band Fury in the Slaughterhouse. The song was released as the second single from the album Mono.

Reception
AllMusic reviewer Tom Demalon called the song "a dark, brooding cut with a hypnotic guitar line" and noted the bleak nature of the lyrics. Demalon said Kai Wingenfelder lacked much range, but called the song the band's best melody.

"Every Generation" is Fury in the Slaughterhouse's most popular and successful single. The song was a commercial success in the band's home country of Germany, peaking at a career high #44 on the Top 100 Singles chart. "Every Generation" was also a success on American rock radio, peaking at #13 and #21 on the Modern Rock and Mainstream Rock charts, respectively.

Track listing
CD maxi single

Promo single

12" single

Chart positions

Personnel
 Kai-Uwe Wingenfelder – vocals
 Thorsten Wingenfelder – guitar
 Christof Stein – guitar
 Hannes Schäfer – bass
 Rainer Schumann – drums

References

1993 songs
1993 singles
Fury in the Slaughterhouse songs
RCA Records singles
Bertelsmann Music Group singles